The grey triggerfish (Balistes capriscus), or gray triggerfish, is a species of ray-finned fish in the triggerfish family. The species is native to shallow parts of the western Atlantic from Nova Scotia to Argentina and also the eastern Atlantic, the Mediterranean Sea and off Angola on the west coast of Africa.

In its appearance and habits, the grey triggerfish is a typical member of the genus Balistes except for its drab, uniformly grey colouration. It is fished recreationally and despite its tough skin, is an excellent food-fish.

Description

The small beak-like mouth at the tip of the snout has fleshy lips. The eyes are set far back near the top of the head. The body is laterally compressed and deep-bodied with a tough, leathery skin. The front dorsal fin has three spines, the first being very strong and much longer than the other two. The second dorsal fin has 26 to 29 soft rays and is much the same size and shape as the anal fin directly below it which has no spines and 23 to 26 soft rays. The pectoral fins are small and rounded. The outer rays of the caudal fin are elongated in larger individuals. The scales on the head and front half of the body are large while those on the hind half are smaller and smooth.

This fish is predominantly pale grey, greenish-grey or yellowish-brown. The body has three indistinct broad dark bars and there is a pale streak on the chin. The upper part of the orbit of the eye is blue and there are some small blue spots and lines on the dorsal fins and upper parts of the body, and sometimes white dots and irregular lines on the lower parts of the body. Both the second dorsal and the anal fin present a somewhat marbled appearance. The body colour fades a little as the animal gets older: juveniles are more colourful.

Distribution and habitat

The grey triggerfish is principally a fish of shallow waters in the western Atlantic Ocean. Its native range extends from Nova Scotia to the Caribbean Sea, the Gulf of Mexico and Bermuda, and southwards to Argentina. It is also found on the other side of the Atlantic, around the British Isles, in the Mediterranean Sea and off the coast of Angola. It may have crossed the Atlantic as a result of the movement of water in the Gulf Stream and breeds in the Mediterranean. Once considered to be an uncommon visitor to northern European seas, an increase in records around the Cornish coast, may indicate it is now breeding there.

Behaviour
Locomotion in the grey triggerfish is by means of undulations of the dorsal fins. If threatened, the fish can work its way into a protective crevice and wedge itself in place by erecting its front dorsal spine. It is difficult to dislodge from this position. The second spine is connected to the first and when it is depressed, it triggers the unlocking of the first spine.

The grey triggerfish is a demersal species and feeds on bottom-dwelling invertebrates such as shrimps, crabs, molluscs, sea urchins, sand dollars, starfish and sea cucumbers. It has strong teeth specialised for making holes in hard-shelled prey. An interesting feeding behaviour has been observed, in which the fish positions itself vertically above a sandy seabed and puffs a stream of water out of its mouth. This disturbs the substrate and may reveal something edible. Further puffs expose more, and the prey item is gripped with the fish's sharp teeth and removed from the seabed. If it is a sand dollar, the fish drops it and picks it up again several times until the prey lands upside down. The fish then adopts its vertical stance once more and attacks the middle with closed jaws, crushing the soft central area. It then scoops out and devours the flesh.

The males prepare up to a dozen nests in hollows blown out of sandy seabed and then patrol the area, driving unwanted fish away. The females roam around inspecting the nest sites. When a female is ready to spawn, both male and female enter a nest and tightly circle round each other while she lays large numbers of minute eggs and he fertilises them. The female stays in the nest, guarding the eggs and blowing and fanning them. The male defends his territory, which may contain other nests with females guarding their eggs. In this way, the male exhibits harem behaviour. Wrasses and red snappers sometimes feed on the eggs which, if they survive that long, hatch after about fifty hours. The fish larvae migrate up towards the surface of the water where they often become part of the community depending on floating sargassum weed. There they feed on algae, barnacles, hydroids and polychaete worms.

Recreational fishing
The grey triggerfish is fished recreationally around Florida and elsewhere. It is known as a notorious bait stealer and is found over hard bottom in  depths off the Atlantic Coast of Florida, often in association with black sea bass and red snapper. Because of its bony mouth it needs a small sharp hook which is usually baited with squid or cut bait. The flesh is of high quality but the consumption of this fish has been linked to isolated cases of ciguatera poisoning.

References

External links
 

grey triggerfish
Fish of the Atlantic Ocean
Fish of the Black Sea
Marine fish of Europe
Fish of the Mediterranean Sea
Sport fish
grey triggerfish
Taxa named by Johann Friedrich Gmelin